The men's 400 metre individual medley event in swimming at the 2013 World Aquatics Championships took place on 4 August at the Palau Sant Jordi in Barcelona, Spain.

Records
Prior to this competition, the existing world and championship records were:

Results

Heats
The heats were held at 10:00.

Final
The final was held at 18:15.

References

External links
Barcelona 2013 Swimming Coverage

Individual medley 400 metre, men's
World Aquatics Championships